Anlong is a county of  Qianxinan Buyei and Miao Autonomous Prefecture, Guizhou, China.

Anlong may also refer to:

Anlong (meteorite)

People:
Mao Anlong (1927-1931), a son of Mao Zedong
Wang Anlong, Chinese military officer

See also
Anlong Run a commune of Thma Koul District in Battambang Province, north-western Cambodia
Anlong Vil, a commune of Sangkae District in Battambang Province, north-western Cambodia
Anlong Veng District a district in Oddar Meanchey province, Cambodia